The Great Book of Interpretation of Dreams attributed to the 7th century Muslim scholar Ibn Sirin which was originally compiled in the 15th century by al-Dārī under the title Selection of Statements on the Exegesis of Dreams. 

The typology of categorization of dreams in Arabic literature of dream interpretation is noted for it close adherence to
orthodox theological categories, and assumes an intimate relationship between dreaming and conventional expressions of devotional religious piety. Traditional Arabic books of dream-interpretation were composed by theologians.

Contents
The Great Book of Interpretation of Dreams is in 59 chapters, thus:

Seeing God Almighty
Seeing the prophets
Seeing archangels and angels
Seeing the Prophet's companions
The various chapters of the Holy Quran
Islam
Saluting and shaking hands
Cleanliness
Call for prayers; praying
Rites
Seeing the mosque, the prayer niche, or the minaret
Seeing alms-giving and the feeding of the poor
Fasting and breaking the fast
Pilgrimage
Jihad
Death, the dead, tombs
Day of Resurrection; the Judgement; the Balance of the Last Day
Hell
Paradise
Jinn 
People, old and young
Parts of the body
Bodily secretions and excrements
Sounds and languages of animals
Pains and diseases
Remedies, medicines, potions
Food, cooking utensils, dining tables
Harps, cups, games, perfumes
Clothes
Sultans, kings and their courts
Warfare and weapons
Craftsmen
Horses and livestock
Wild beasts
Birds
Traps, fishing hooks, snares
Pests, insects
Breeze, wind, rain, earthquakes, lightning, rainbow, etc.
 -
Metals, minerals, petroleum
Sea, rivers, wells
Fire
Trees
Grain, legumes, melons, cucumber
Pens, ink, writing
Idols
Rugs, beds, canopies, curtains, tents
Riders, saddles, stirrups, reins, bridles
Spinning, weaving, ropes
Sleeping; servants and slaves
Drinking and eating
Calamities
Pairs of opposite qualities
Marriage and adultery
Traveling
Selling, lending, borrowing
Disputes
Scattered dreams
Stories by holy men

References

1991 non-fiction books
Books about dream interpretation
Books about Islam

External links
Tafsir al ahlam
A brief overview of ibn Sirin book